The cash break even ratio is used in evaluating the financial performance of an income property to determine what rate of occupancy is required to meet both operating expense and mortgage payments (debt service).

Formula 
Cash Break Even Ratio = (Operating Expenses + Mortgage Payment - Reserves for Replacement) / Potential Gross Income

It allows both lenders and investors to assess a particular income properties ability to meet its operating expenses and provide a measurable level of profit. The ratio does not include reserves for replacement, because it is not an actual cash expense. Additionally, it includes mortgage payment (debt service) which applies to most income properties that use leverage to enhance return on investment and equity dividend rate (cash on cash return).

References

Business terms
Mortgage